Ada Salas or AdaMc (born 1965) is a Spanish poet and author. She has worked as a teacher. Her poetry is known for its inclusion of pauses.

Life
Ada (Moreno) Salas was born in Cáceres, Spain in 1965. She earned a doctorate in philology at the University of Extremadura. She  taught in France at the University of Angers. Juan Manuel Rozas was meant to have been her teacher, but he died in 1987. Salas entered the competition named in his memory and won the award in 1988

.Awards and recognition 
1988  Arte y memoria del inocente Salas, Ada. Published by the Universidad de Extremadura II Premio "Juan Manuel Rozas" de Poesía.

1994  Variaciones en blanco .  the Hiperión Prize.

2007  Esto no es el silencio   won the 15th Ricardo Molina – Ciudad de Córdoba prize.

2011 El margen, el error, la tachadura. Notas acerca de la escritura poética (Diputación de Badajoz)  Fernando Pérez Essay Prize 

2011  El margen, el error, la tachadura. Notas acerca de la escritura poética (Diputación de Badajoz)  won the Fernando Pérez Essay Prize

Works 

 Arte y memoria del inocente (1988)
 Variaciones en blanco (1994)
 La sed (1997)
 Lugar de la derrota (2003)
 Noticia de la luz
 Escuela de Arte de Mérida prose
 Alguien aquí. Notas acerca de la escritura poética
 Esto no es el silencio
 A la Misericordia y Las tinieblas by Robert Desnos - she and Juan Abeleira translated
 No duerme el animal (2009) (compilation)
 Ashes to Ashes (2010)
 Limbo y otros poemas
 Diez mandamientos 
 Poesía española reciente, Cano Ballesta, Juan 1980-2000 
 El margen, el error, la tachadura. Notas acerca de la escritura poética (Diputación de Badajoz) 
 Salas, with Juan Abeleira, translated A la Misteriosa y Las tinieblas  by the French writer  Robert Desnos
La otra joven poesía española (Igitur, 2003)
Poesía española reciente,Cano Ballesta, Juan  1980-2000
Descendimiento, Valencia, Pre-Textos, 2018

References

1965 births
Living people
People from Cáceres, Spain
Spanish women poets
20th-century Spanish poets
20th-century Spanish women writers
21st-century Spanish poets
21st-century Spanish women writers